The Coppa Campioni d'Italia is the trophy that in Italian football represents the victory of the Serie A championship.

The trophy was created in 1960 by sculptor and medalist Ettore Calvelli; has a height of 45 cm around and weighs about 5 kg, rests on a stone base hard blue sodalite and has at its center a ring of gold depicting an allegory of athletes; between 2015 and 2016, these dimensions increased (specifically, about 20 cm in height) for television requirements. The Cup has a value of about 60,000 euro and bears engraved on golden base, the names of all the teams that have won the top division since the season 1960–61.

The first team to be awarded the Coppa Campioni d'Italia was Juventus in 1961, the same club as in 2005 received the trophy for the first time on the field (which they were later stripped of).

The original trophy remains property of the Lega Serie A and is only held in custody by the winning club; when returned the club receives a reduced scale model to be exhibited in their trophy room.

List of winners

Number of cups by club

Bold indicates clubs currently playing in the top division.

References

Italian awards
Serie A